Jordi Bosch i Palacios (born 1956 in Mataró, Spain) is a Spanish actor.

Theatre
1981 – "Mort accidental d'un anarquista", by Dario Fo. Dir. Pere Planella. Teatre Regina and Villarroel Teatre, Barcelona
1983 – "Advertència per a embarcacions petites", by Tennessee Williams. Dir. Carlos Gandolfo. Teatre Lliure, Barcelona
1983 – "L'hèroe", by Santiago Rusiñol. Dir. Fabià Puigserver. Teatre Lliure i Festival del Grec, Barcelona
1983 – "Al vostre gust", by William Shakespeare. Dir. Lluís Pasqual. Teatre Lliure, Barcelona
1984 – "La flauta màgica", by Emmanuel Schikaneder. Dir. Fabià Puigserver. Teatre Lliure, Barcelona
1985 – "Un dels últims vespres del carnaval", by Carlo Goldoni. Dir. Lluís Pasqual. Teatre Lliure, Barcelona
1986 – "Fulgor i mort de Joaquín Murieta", by Pablo Neruda. Dir. Fabià Puigserver. Teatre Lliure, Barcelona
1986 – "El tango de don Joan", by Quim Monzó and Jérôme Savary. Dir. Jérôme Savary. Teatre Lliure, Barcelona
1987 – "30 d'abril", by Joan Oliver. Dir. Pere Planella. Teatre Lliure, Barcelona
1987 – "El muntaplats", by Harold Pinter. Dir. Carme Portacelli. Teatre Lliure, Barcelona
1987 – "Lorenzaccio, Lorenzaccio", by Alfred de Musset. Dir. Lluís Pasqual. Teatre Lliure, Barcelona
1988 – "La bona persona de Sezuan", by Bertolt Brecht. Dir. Fabià Puigserver. Mercat de les Flors, Barcelona
1988 – "Titànic-92", by Guillem-Jordi Graells. Dir. Pere Planella. Teatre Lliure, Barcelona
1989 – "Les noces de Fígaro", by Pierre Beaumarchais. Dir. Fabià Puigserver. Teatre Lliure, Barcelona
1989 – "Set escenes de Hamlet", by Benet Casablancas. Dir. Josep Pons. Teatre Lliure, Barcelona
1989 – "El viatge (o els cadàvers exaquisits)”, by Manuel Vázquez Montalbán. Dir. Ariel García Valdés. Teatre Romea, Barcelona
1990 – "Els gegants de la muntanya", by Luigi Pirandello. Dir. Xicu Masó. Teatre Lliure, Barcelona
1990 – "Sinfonietta – L'arca de Noé”, by Benjamin Britten. Dir. Josep Pons. Sant Felip Neri Church, Barcelona
1990 – "Capvespre al jardí”, by Ramon Gomis. Dir. Lluís Pasqual. Teatre Lliure, Barcelona
1990 – "Restauració”, by Eduardo Mendoza. Dir. Ariel García Valdés. Teatre Romea, Barcelona
1991 – "Bala perduda", by Lluís Elias. Dir. Xavier Berraondo. TVC, Barcelona
1991 – "Història d'un soldat", by Charles Ferdinand Ramuz. Dir. Lluís Homar and Josep Pons. Teatre Lliure, Barcelona
1991 – "Timon d'Atenes", by William Shakespeare. Dir. Ariel Garcia Valdés. Teatre Lliure, Barcelona
1992 – "El parc", by Botho Strauss. Dir. Carme Portacelli. Teatre Lliure, Barcelona
1992 – "El desengany", by Francesc Fontanella. Dir. Domènech Reixach. Teatre Romea, Barcelona
1993 – "La guàrdia blanca", by Mikhaïl Bulgàkov. Dir. Pavel Khomsky. Teatre Romea, Barcelona
1993 – "Roberto Zucco", by Bernard-Marie Koltès. Dir. Lluís Pasqual. Palau de l'Agricultura, Barcelona
1993 – "Some enchanted evening", by Irving Berlin, Leonard Bernstein, George Gershwin, Cole Porter and Stephen Sondheim. Dir. Josep Pons. Teatre Lliure, Barcelona
1994 – "El barret de cascavells", by Luigi Pirandello. Dir. Lluís Homar. Teatre Lliure, Barcelona
1994 – "Las bodas de Fígaro", by Pierre Beaumarchaisanton. Dir. Fabià Puigserver. Teatro La Comedia, Madrid
1995 – "Arsènic i puntes de coixí”, by Joseph Kesselring. Dir. Anna Lizaran. Teatre Lliure, Barcelonala, Lluís Soler, Jordi Torras, Artur Trias
1995 – "Els bandits", by Friedrich von Schiller. Dir. Lluís Homar. Mercat de les Flors, Barcelona
1995 – "Viatge a Califòrnia", by Toni Cabré. Dir. Toni Cabré. Teatre Romea, Barcelona
1996 – "Lear o el somni d'una actriu", by William Shakespeare. Dir. Ariel Garcia Valdés. Teatre Lliure, Barcelona
1996 – "El temps i l'habitació”, by Botho Strauss. Dir. Lluís Homar. Teatre Romea, Barcelona
1997 – "Zowie", by Sergi Pompermayer. Dir. Lluís Homar. Teatre Lliure, Barcelona
1998 – "Morir", by Sergi Belbel. Dir. Sergi Belbel. Teatre Romea, Barcelona
1998 – "Poetry reading: Miquel Martí i Pol”. Teatre Lliure, Barcelona
1998 – "Fuita", by Jordi Galceran. Dir. Eduard Cortés. Gira per Catalunya
1999 – "Cantonada Brossa", by Joan Brossa. Dir. Josep M.Mestres, Josep Montanyès, Lluís Pasqual and Rosa Maria Sardà. Teatre Lliure, Barcelona
1999 – "Andorra màgica en vuit dies", by Miquel Desclot. Dir. Gerard Claret. Auditori Nacional d'Andorra (Ordino), Andorra
2000 – "Espai pel somni", by Miquel Martí i Pol. Centre Cultural de Sant Cugat i Teatre Lliure, Barcelona
2000 – "L'hort dels cirerers", by Anton Chekhov. Dir. Lluís Pasqual. Teatre Lliure, Barcelona
2001 – "Novecento, el pianista de l'oceà”, by Alessandro Baricco. Dir. Fernando Bernués. Teatre Poliorama, Barcelona
2001 – "Improvisacions sobre la Història d'un soldat", by Stravinsky. Sala Beckett, Barcelona
2001 – "L'adéu de Lucrècia Borja", by Carles Santos and Joan-Francesc Mira. Dir. Carles Santos. Teatre Lliure, Barcelona
2002 – "El llenguatge dels àngels", by Vicenç Ferrer, Gabriel García Márquez, Goethe, Isaias, Nelson Mandela, Pablo Neruda, Palau i Fabre. Dir. Jordi Bosch. Sant Agustí Convent, Barcelona
2002/2004 – "Dissabte, diumenge i dilluns", by Eduardo De Filippo. Dir. Sergi Belbel. Teatre Nacional de Catalunya, Barcelona
2003 – "Primera plana", by Ben Hecht and Charles McArthur. Dir. Sergi Belbel. Teatre Nacional de Catalunya, Barcelona
2004 – "Greus qüestions", by Eduardo Mendoza Garriga. Dir. Rosa Novell. Sala Muntaner, Barcelona
2005 – "Fuente Ovejuna", by Lope de Vega. Dir. Ramon Simó. Teatre Nacional de Catalunya, Barcelona
2005 – "Fi de partida", by Samuel Beckett. Dir. Rosa Novell. Teatre Grec, Barcelona
2006 – "Adreça desconeguda", by Kathrine Kressmann Taylor. Dir. Fernando Bernués. Teatre Bartrina, Reus and Teatre Borràs, Barcelona
2006/2007 – "La nit just abans dels boscos", by Bernard-Marie Koltès. Dir. Àlex Rigola. Teatre Municipal, Girona / Teatre Lliure, Barcelona
2007 – "Set escenes de Hamlet", by Benet Casablancas. Dir. Santiago Serrate. Teatre Principal, Sabadell
2007 – "Play Strindberg", by Friedrich Dürrenmatt. Dir. Georges Lavaudant. Teatro de la Abadía, Madrid
2007 – "Un roure", by Tim Crouch. Dir. Roser Batalla. Club Capitol, Barcelona
2007 – "Hay que purgar a Totó”, by Georges Feydeau. Dir. Georges Lavaudant. Teatro Español, Madrid + tour
2008 – "Andorra màgica en vuit dies", by Miquel Desclot. Dir. Gerard Claret. Petit Palau, Barcelona
2008 / 2009 – "Monty Python's Spamalot", by Eric Idle. Dir. Tricicle. Teatre Victòria, Barcelona / Teatro Lope de Vega, Madrid
2009 – "Garrick" (500 shows), by Tricicle. Dir. Tricicle. Teatre Poliorama, Barcelona
2010 / 2011 – "Celebració", by Harold Pinter. Dir. Lluís Pasqual. Teatre de Salt, Girona / Teatre Lliure, Barcelona
2011 – "El misantrop", by Molière. Dir. Georges Lavaudant. Teatre Nacional de Catalunya, Barcelona.
2011 – "Candide", by Leonard Bernstein. Dir. Paco Mir. Teatro Auditorio San Lorenzo del Escorial, Madrid.
2011 / 2012 – "Els jugadors, by Pau Miró. Dir. Pau Miró. Teatre de Salt, Girona / Teatre Lliure, Barcelona
2012 – "Quitt", by Peter Handke. Dir. Lluís Pasqual. Teatre Lliure, Barcelona / CDN, Madrid
2012 – "La Bête", by David Hirson. Dir. Sergi Belbel. TNC, Barcelona
2013 – "Blackbird", by David Harrower. Dir. Lluís Pasqual. Teatre Lliure, Barcelona
2013 – "Els feréstecs", by Carlo Goldoni. Dir. Lluís Pasqual. Teatre Lliure, Barcelona
2013 – "Tots fem comèdia", by Joaquín Oristrell and Joan Vives. Dir. Joaquín Oristrell. Teatre Poliorama, Barcelona
2013 – "El crèdit", by Jordi Galceran. Dir. Sergi Belbel. Sala Villarroel, Barcelona
2015 - "El rei Lear", by William Shakespeare. Dir. Lluís Pasqual. Teatre Lliure, Barcelona
2015 - "Caiguts del cel", by Sébastien_Thiéry. Dir. Sergi Belbel. Teatre Condal, Barcelona
2016 - "A teatro con Eduardo", by Eduardo de Filippo. Dir. Lluís Pasqual. Teatre Lliure, Barcelona
2017 - "L'ànec salvatge", by Henrik Ibsen. Dir. Julio Manrique. Teatre Lliure, Barcelona
2017 - "Infàmia", by Pere Riera. Dir. Pere Riera. Catalonia tour

Television
1992/1995 – "Quico, el progre", TV3
1993 – "Agència de viatges", TV3
1993 – "La Lloll", TV3
1994 – "Arnau", TV3
1995 – "Estació d'enllaç", TV3
1995 – "Pedralbes Centre", TV3
1996 – "Nissaga de poder", TV3
1999 – "La memòria dels Cargol", TV3
1999 – "Junts" (TV-movie), TV3
2000 – "Nissaga, l'herència", TV3
2000 – "El comisario", T5
2000 – "Crims", TV3
2001/2003 – "Jet lag", TV3
2002 – "Majoria absoluta", TV3
2005 – "Abuela de verano", TVE
2006 – "Con dos tacones", TVE
2007 – "Després de la pluja" (TV-movie), TV3/TVG
2007 – "La Via Augusta", TV3
2008 – "Lex", Antena 3
2010/2011 – "La sagrada família", TV3
2010 – "Més dinamita", TV3
2012/2013 – "Gran Hotel", Antena 3
2013 – "Polònia", TV3

Cinema
1989 – "Capità Escalaborns" by Carles Benpar
1991 – "La febre d'or" by Gonzalo Herralde
1993 – "Monturiol, el senyor del mar" by Francesc Bellmunt
1994 – "El perquè de tot plegat" by Ventura Pons
1995  –  Boca a boca by Manuel Gómez Pereira
1996 – "The Good Life" by David Trueba
1996 – "De qué se ríen las mujeres" by Joaquin Oristrell
2000 – "Carretera y manta" by Alfonso Arandia
2001 – "Silencio roto" by Montxo Armendáriz
2001 – "Deseo" by Gerardo Vera
2006 – "La educación de las hadas" by José Luis Cuerda
2006 – "Va a ser que nadie es perfecto" by Joaquín Oristrell
2007 – "Barcelona" by Ventura Pons
2010 – "Tres metros sobre el cielo" by Fernando González Molina.
2011 – "Mil cretins" by Ventura Pons
2011 – "23-F" by Chema de la Peña
2012 – "Tengo ganas de ti" by Fernando González Molina

Awards
- from the Theatrical Critic Press of Barcelona season 90 – 91 for the play "Restauració"
- from the Professional Actors and Directors Association of Catalunya. Best supporting theatre actor season 90–91 for the play "Restauració"
- National of Catalan Theatre 1994 for the play "El barret de cascavells"
- from the Theatrical Critic Press of Barcelona season 93–94 for the play "El barret de cascavells"
- from the Professional Actors and Directors Association of Catalunya. Best cinema actor season 93 – 94 for the movie "El perquè de tot plegat"
- Butaca-95 best cinema actor for the movie "El perquè de tot plegat"
- from the Theatrical Critic Press of Barcelona season 98–99, for the play "Cantonada Brossa"
- Butaca-03 best theatre actor for the play "Dissabte, diumenge, dilluns"

Bibliography

External links
The Jordi Bosch page (in Catalan)

1956 births
Male film actors from Catalonia
Male stage actors from Catalonia
Male television actors from Catalonia
Male actors from Barcelona
Living people